Best in the World (2018) was a professional wrestling pay-per-view event produced by Ring of Honor (ROH). It took place at the UMBC Event Center in Catonsville, Maryland on June 29, 2018. It was the ninth annual ROH Best in the World event.  Wrestlers from New Japan Pro-Wrestling (NJPW), and Japanese women's promotion World Wonder Ring Stardom - with whom ROH has partnerships - also appeared on the card.

Storylines 
Best in the World featured professional wrestling matches that involved wrestlers from pre-existing scripted feuds, plots, and storylines that played out on ROH's primary television program, Ring of Honor Wrestling. Wrestlers portrayed heroes or villains as they followed a series of events that built tension and culminated in a wrestling match or series of matches.

At Final Battle, Dalton Castle defeated Cody to win the ROH World Championship. At Supercard of Honor XII Castle defeated Marty Scurll to retain the ROH World Title. At Masters of the Craft Scurll won a Defy or Deny Match (a fatal 4-way elimination match where if an opponent is eliminated by the champion that person cannot get a title shot until a new champion is crowned but if the champion is eliminated the person that eliminated him will get a future title shot) by last eliminating Castle earning him a future title shot. At Bound By Honor Scurll and Cody won an 8-man tag team elimination match with Cody last eliminating Dalton, however Cody had tagged himself in on Marty's behalf and Marty felt Cody had stolen his victory. During the ROH/NJPW War of the Worlds Tour there was obvious tension between Scurll and Cody. It was then announced via ROH's website that Castle would be defending the ROH World Title against both Cody and Marty.

At Bound By Honor, Punishment Martinez attacked Adam Page. During the ROH/NJPW War of the World Tour Page cost Martinez the IWGP United States Championship and Martinez cost Page the ROH World Television Championship. Page and Martinez were also scheduled to a match during the tour but Page attacked Martinez and the match never became official. At State of the Art: Dallas, Martinez beat Silas Young to win the TV Title. ROH then announced that Martinez will defend the title against Page at Best in the World.

Results

See also
 2018 in professional wrestling

References

External links
Official Ring of Honor website

Professional wrestling in Baltimore
2018 in Maryland
2018
June 2018 events in the United States
2018 Ring of Honor pay-per-view events
Events in Baltimore